Tomasz Loska (born 26 January 1996) is a Polish professional footballer who plays as a goalkeeper for Bruk-Bet Termalica Nieciecza.

Career

Górnik Zabrze
Loska joined Górnik Zabrze in January 2017. On 30 June 2020 it was confirmed, that Loska had joined Bruk-Bet Termalica Nieciecza on loan for the rest of the season.

References

External links

1996 births
Living people
Polish footballers
Association football goalkeepers
Górnik Zabrze players
Raków Częstochowa players
GKS Tychy players
Piast Gliwice players
Bruk-Bet Termalica Nieciecza players
Ekstraklasa players
I liga players
II liga players
People from Knurów
Poland under-21 international footballers